Nigel Freminot is a Seychellois football player.  He is a defender on the Seychelles national football team, having good education and coming from a sporty family. Freminot currently plays for Seychellois club St Michel United FC, where he is the captain.

References

Year of birth missing (living people)
Living people
Seychellois footballers
Seychelles international footballers
St Michel United FC players

Association football defenders